Hafız Mehmet (1874 – 14 June 1926) was a Turkish politician and the Minister of Justice for the Republic of Turkey.  While serving as a deputy in Trabzon, he was a witness to the Armenian genocide. His testimony of the event is considered by genocide scholar Vahakn Dadrian as one of the "rarest corroborations of the fact of the complicity of governmental officials in the organization of the mass murder of Armenians". He was sentenced to death after the Izmir trials of 1926, charged with attempting to assassinate Mustafa Kemal Atatürk.

Early life 
Hafız Mehmet was born in the Ottoman Empire in the village of Sürmene located near Trabzon in 1874. He was the son of Hacı Yakubzâde Ahmed Ağa. He received his early education in local schools near Trabzon. Mehmet moved to Istanbul to study law, where he ultimately attained a degree in law. He served as a lawyer throughout the Ottoman Empire.

In the 1912 and 1914 Young Turk elections, Hafız Mehmet was elected as a deputy who represented Trabzon. As a practicing lawyer, Mehmet was nicknamed "hukukcu" or lawyer.

Armenian Genocide witness 
Hafız Mehmet served as a deputy in Trabzon, where an estimated 50,000 Armenians were killed during the Armenian genocide. Since Trabzon was a coastal city of the Black Sea, the method employed to kill was mainly mass drowning. Hafız Mehmet witnessed such drownings of Armenians off the coast of Ordu, near Trabzon, and provided testimony of his eyewitness accounts during a 21 December 1918 parliamentary session of the Chamber of Deputies:

Hafız Mehmet stated that he and other deputies knew beforehand that the Young Turk government had an underlying aim to exterminate the Armenian population. He also said that those tasked to carry out the responsibility were members of the Special Organization, a special task force under the auspices of the imperial Ottoman government, but that these individuals received orders directly from Cemal Azmi, the governor of the Trabzon province. Mehmet testified that he attempted to stop the massacres by trying to speak with Interior Minister Talat Pasha directly but that Talat never responded to his inquiries and never questioned the actions of the politicians in Trabzon.

Hafız Mehmet's testimony is considered by genocide scholar Vahakn Dadrian as a representation of the "rarest corroborations of the fact of the complicity of governmental officials in the organization of the mass murder of the Armenians." Others have provided similar testimonies including Oscar S. Heizer, the American consul at Trabzon, who reported that "many of the children were loaded into boats and taken out to sea and thrown overboard." The Italian consul of Trabzon in 1915, Giacomo Gorrini also wrote: "I saw thousands of innocent women and children placed on boats which were capsized in the Black Sea".

Later life and death 
Hafız Mehmet was sentenced to death after the Izmir trials of 1926. The trials condemned thirty-six individuals for attempting to assassinate Mustafa Kemal Atatürk.

See also 
Trabzon during the Armenian Genocide
Witnesses and testimonies of the Armenian genocide

References 
Notes

References

External links 

1874 births
1926 deaths
People executed by Turkey by hanging
Witnesses of the Armenian genocide
People from Sürmene
Executed Turkish people
People executed for treason against Turkey
20th-century executions for treason
Turkish politicians
Istanbul University Faculty of Law alumni